Imre Nagy (7 May 1941 – 24 May 2011) was a Canadian fencer. He competed in the team sabre event at the 1976 Summer Olympics.

References

1941 births
2011 deaths
Canadian male fencers
Hungarian emigrants to Canada
Olympic fencers of Canada
Fencers at the 1976 Summer Olympics
Sportspeople from Cluj-Napoca